Cityscape is an album by saxophonist David "Fathead" Newman which was recorded in 2005 and released on the HighNote label early the following year.

Reception

In his review on AllMusic, Thom Jurek states "Cityscape is one of those moments where a veteran jazzman places himself in a setting in order to showcase the music he's made -- David "Fathead" Newman is beginning his sixth decade as a working musician—what he's learned and where he's likely to travel ... Newman's consistency as a bandleader is remarkable and this is yet another session that proves the point. The man is a treasure". In JazzTimes, Chris Kelsey noted "Cityscape proves that Newman hasn’t lost much off his fastball. He’s still a solid, straight-forward improviser, heavy on blues feeling and refreshingly light on frills".

Track listing 
All compositions by David "Fathead" Newman except where noted
 "Goldfinger" (John Barry, Leslie Bricusse, Anthony Newley) – 5:44
 "Pharoah's Gold" (Claude Joseph Johnson) — 6:39
 "A Flower Is a Lovesome Thing" (Billy Strayhorn) – 7:04
 "Bu Bop Bass" – 4:10	
 "Here Comes Sonny Man" – 4:41
 "It Was a Very Good Year" (Ervin Drake) – 6:03
 "Flankin" – 6:57
 "Sheakin' In" – 6:22
 "Suki Duki" – 4:40

Personnel 
David "Fathead" Newman – tenor saxophone, alto saxophone, flute
Winston Byrd – flugelhorn, trumpet
Benny Powell – trombone (tracks 1, 3 & 6-9)
Howard Johnson – baritone saxophone
David Leonhardt – piano 
John Menegon – bass 
Yoron Israel – drums

References 

David "Fathead" Newman albums
2006 albums
HighNote Records albums